Émile François Loubet (30 December 183820 December 1929) was the 45th Prime Minister of France from February to December 1892 and later President of France from 1899 to 1906.

Trained in law, he became mayor of Montélimar, where he was noted as a forceful orator. He was elected to the Chamber of Deputies in 1876 and the Senate in 1885. He was appointed as a Republican minister under Carnot and Ribot. He was briefly Prime Minister of France in 1892. As President, he saw the successful Paris Exhibition of 1900, and the forging of the Entente Cordiale with the United Kingdom of Great Britain and Ireland, resolving their sharp differences over the Boer War and the Dreyfus Affair.

Early life
Loubet was born on 30 December 1838, the son of a peasant proprietor and mayor of Marsanne (Drôme). Admitted to the Parisian bar in 1862, he took his doctorate in law the next year. He was still a student when he witnessed the sweeping triumph of the Republican party in Paris at the general election in 1863, during the Second French Empire. He settled down to the exercise of his profession in Montélimar, where in 1869 he married Marie-Louise Picard. He also inherited a small estate at Grignan.

Physical description

American politician William Jennings Bryan described Loubet as "below the medium height, even for Frenchmen. His shoulders are broad and his frame indicative of great physical strength. His hair is snow white, as are also his beard and mustache. He wears his beard square cut at the chin. . . . His voice is soft, and he speaks with great vivacity, emphasizing his words by expressive gestures."

Political career
At the crisis of 1870, which brought about the Empire's end, he became mayor of Montélimar, and thenceforward was a steady supporter of Léon Gambetta. Elected to the Chamber of Deputies in 1876 by Montélimar, he was one of the notable 363 parliamentarians who in the 16 May 1877 crisis passed a vote of no confidence in the ministry of Albert, the duke of Broglie.

In the general election of October he was re-elected, local enthusiasm for him being increased by the fact that the government had driven him from the mayoralty. In the Chamber he occupied himself especially with education, fighting the clerical system established by the Loi Falloux, and working for the establishment of free, obligatory and secular primary instruction. In 1880 he became president of the departmental council in Drôme. His support of the second Jules Ferry ministry and his zeal for the colonial expansion of France gave him considerable weight in the moderate Republican party.

He had entered the Senate in 1885, and he became minister of public works in the Tirard ministry (December 1887 to March 1888). In 1892 President Sadi Carnot, who was his personal friend, asked him to form a cabinet. Loubet held the portfolio of the interior with the premiership, and had to deal with the anarchist crimes of that year and with the great strike of Carmaux, in which he acted as arbitrator, giving a decision regarded in many quarters as too favourable to the strikers. He was defeated in November on the question of the Panama scandals, but he retained the ministry of the interior in the next cabinet under Alexandre Ribot, though he resigned on its reconstruction in January.

President of the French Republic (1899–1906)

His reputation as an orator of great force and lucidity of exposition and as a safe and honest statesman procured for him in 1896 the presidency of the Senate, and in February 1899 he was chosen president of the republic in succession to Félix Faure by 483 votes as against 279 recorded by Jules Méline, his only serious competitor.

He was marked out for fierce opposition and bitter insult, as the representative of that section of the Republican party which sought the revision of the Dreyfus affair. On the day of President Faure's funeral Paul Déroulède met the troops under General Roget on their return to barracks, and demanded that the general should march on the Elysée. Roget sensibly took his troops back to barracks. At the Auteuil steeplechase in June, the president was struck on the head with a cane by an anti-Dreyfusard. In that month President Loubet summoned Waldeck-Rousseau to form a cabinet, and at the same time entreated Republicans of all shades of opinion to rally to the defence of the state. By the efforts of Loubet and Waldeck-Rousseau the Dreyfus affair was settled, when Loubet, acting on the advice of General Galliffet, minister of war, remitted the ten years' imprisonment to which Dreyfus was condemned at Rennes.

Loubet's presidency saw an acute stage of the clerical question, which was attacked by Waldeck-Rousseau and in still more drastic fashion by the Combes ministry. The French ambassador was recalled from the Vatican in April 1905, and in July the separation of church and state was voted in the Chamber of Deputies. Feeling had run high between France and Britain over the mutual criticisms passed on the conduct of the South African War and the Dreyfus affair respectively. These differences were composed, by the Anglo-French entente, and in 1904 a convention between the two countries secured the recognition of French claims in Morocco in exchange for non-interference with the British occupation of Egypt. President Loubet belonged to the peasant-proprietor class, and had none of the aristocratic proclivities of President Faure. He inaugurated the Paris Exhibition of 1900, received the emperor Nicholas II of Russia at the French maneuvers of 1901 and paid a visit to Russia in 1902.

On 4 July 1902 President Loubet was elected an honorary member of the Rhode Island Society of the Cincinnati.

Loubet also exchanged visits with King Edward VII, with the king of Portugal, the king of Italy and the king of Spain. During the king of Spain's visit in 1905, an attempt was made on his life, a bomb being thrown under his carriage as he and with his guest left the Opéra Garnier. When his presidency came to an end in January 1906, he became the first President of the Third Republic to have served a full term and without resigning a second one. He retired into private life and died on 20 December 1929 at the age of 90.

Honours
He received the following orders and decorations:

Loubet's Ministry, 27 February6 December 1892
Émile Loubet – President of the Council and Minister of the Interior
Alexandre Ribot – Minister of Foreign Affairs
Charles de Freycinet – Minister of War
Maurice Rouvier – Minister of Finance
Louis Ricard – Minister of Justice and Worship
Jules Roche – Minister of Commerce, Industry, and the Colonies
Godefroy Cavaignac – Minister of Marine
Léon Bourgeois – Minister of Public Instruction and Fine Arts
Jules Develle – Minister of Agriculture
Yves Guyot – Minister of Public Works

Changes
8 March 1892 – Godefroy Cavaignac succeeds Roche as Minister for the Colonies.  Roche remains Minister of Commerce and Industry.

References

External links

 
 

|-

|-

|-

|-

|-

1838 births
1929 deaths
19th-century presidents of France
20th-century presidents of France
Princes of Andorra
19th-century Princes of Andorra
20th-century Princes of Andorra
People from Montélimar
Politicians from Auvergne-Rhône-Alpes
French republicans
Senators of Drôme
Prime Ministers of France
Transport ministers of France
French interior ministers
French Senators of the Third Republic
Members of the 1st Chamber of Deputies of the French Third Republic
Members of the 2nd Chamber of Deputies of the French Third Republic
Members of the 3rd Chamber of Deputies of the French Third Republic
Recipients of the Order of the Netherlands Lion
Grand Crosses of the Order of Saint-Charles
Recipients of the Order of St. Anna, 1st class
Knights of the Golden Fleece of Spain
Knights of the Order of the Norwegian Lion